The Hart County School District is a public school district in Hart County, Georgia, United States, based in Hartwell. It serves the communities of Bowersville, Canon, Hartwell, Reed Creek, and Royston.

Schools
The Hart County School District has three elementary schools, one middle school, and one high school.

Elementary schools 
Hartwell Elementary School
North Hart Elementary School
South Hart Elementary School

Middle school
Hart County Middle School

High school
Hart County High School

Academy
Hart County Academy

References

External links

Goldmine historical marker
Shoal Creek historical marker

School districts in Georgia (U.S. state)
Education in Hart County, Georgia
Hartwell, Georgia